Pithemera is a genus of annelids belonging to the family Megascolecidae.

The species of this genus are found in Southeastern Asia.

Species:

Pithemera altaresi 
Pithemera donvictorianoi 
Pithemera duhuani

References

Annelids